Streblus taxoides is a species of plant in the family Moraceae, tribe Moreae.  It is a medium-sized, spiny bush (as in its Vietnamese name duối gai) found in the sub-canopy layer of Asian tropical forests.  This species can be found in India, China, Indo-China and Malesia; no subspecies are listed in the Catalogue of Life. It is dioecious, with male and female flowers borne on separate plants.

References

External links
 

taxoides
Flora of Indo-China
Flora of Malesia
Dioecious plants